Marko Nikolić (Serbian Cyrillic: Марко Николић; born June 9, 1989) is a Serbian footballer who plays for VfB Forstinning in Germany.

Club career
Nikolić was scouted at the age of 12 by Red Star Belgrade, and he signed for the club in 2002 when he was only a 13-year-old. He has been moved from the U-19 Red Star Belgrade Academy to the first team during the season 2006-07, having made one league appearance in that season. The central midfielder or right winger, played the later 2012/2013 season with Swedish Division 1 Norra side Valsta Syrianska IK.

International career
He has made several appearances for the Serbia national under-19 football team.

Notes

External links
 
 Marko Nikolić at Fupa

1989 births
Living people
Footballers from Belgrade
Serbian footballers
Serbian expatriate footballers
Red Star Belgrade footballers
FK Srem players
FK Bežanija players
FK Napredak Kruševac players
FK Voždovac players
FK Velež Mostar players
OFK Grbalj players
OFK Žarkovo players
FC Spartaki Tskhinvali players
Serbian SuperLiga players
Ettan Fotboll players
Serbian First League players
Premier League of Bosnia and Herzegovina players
Montenegrin First League players
Association football midfielders
Serbian expatriate sportspeople in Bosnia and Herzegovina
Serbian expatriate sportspeople in Montenegro
Serbian expatriate sportspeople in Sweden
Serbian expatriate sportspeople in Georgia (country)
Serbian expatriate sportspeople in Germany
Expatriate footballers in Bosnia and Herzegovina
Expatriate footballers in Montenegro
Expatriate footballers in Sweden
Expatriate footballers in Georgia (country)
Expatriate footballers in Germany